is a railway station in Ōta, Tokyo, Japan, operated jointly by Tokyo Monorail and the private railway operator Keikyu. It is named after a nearby pedestrian bridge that was completed in 1993.

Lines
Keikyu Airport Line (station number KK15)
Tokyo Monorail Haneda Airport Line (station number MO07)

Only "Local" all-stations services stop at this station.

Station layout
Each of the Keikyu and Tokyo Monorail sections of the station has two side platforms serving two tracks. Both lines are underground.

History 
The station replaced two earlier stations: the original , which served as the southern terminal station of the Keikyu Airport Line from 1956 to 1991 (but was located a considerable distance from the terminal and only had local service to Kamata), and the former Tokyo Monorail , which opened on 17 September 1964 underneath the domestic terminal at Haneda Airport and was the main rapid transit access between Haneda and downtown Tokyo.

The new "Big Bird" domestic terminal at Haneda Airport opened on a new site in 1993, requiring an extension of both lines. Keikyu closed its airport access line in January 1991 and opened a new  at the present site of Tenkūbashi Station on 1 April 1993, which became the interim terminal for the Keikyu Airport Line. The Tokyo Monorail was extended to the new terminal on 27 September 1993, and Haneda Station was concurrently relocated to the new Keikyu station site in order to allow transfers between the two lines. The station was renamed Tenkūbashi Station on 18 November 1998, at the time of the Keikyu extension to Haneda Airport Station, in order to avoid confusion with the latter.

Keikyu introduced station numbering to its stations on 21 October 2010; Tenkūbashi was assigned station number KK15.

Passenger statistics
In fiscal 2011, the Keikyu station was used by an average of 18,613 passengers daily, and the Tokyo Monorail station was used by an average of 9,752 passengers daily.

Surrounding area
 Haneda Airport
 Haneda Shrine

See also
 List of railway stations in Japan

References

External links

 Keikyu station information 
 Tokyo Monorail station information 

Tokyo Monorail Haneda Line
Stations of Tokyo Monorail
Stations of Keikyu
Railway stations in Tokyo
Railway stations in Japan opened in 1993